In mathematics, particularly in mathematical logic and set theory, a club set is a subset of a limit ordinal that is closed under the order topology, and is unbounded (see below) relative to the limit ordinal.  The name club is a contraction of "closed and unbounded".

Formal definition

If  is a limit ordinal and  then  is unbounded in  if for any  there is some  such that 

If a set is both closed and unbounded, then it is a club set. Closed proper classes are also of interest (every proper class of ordinals is unbounded in the class of all ordinals).

For example, the set of all countable limit ordinals is a club set with respect to the first uncountable ordinal; but it is not a club set with respect to any higher limit ordinal, since it is neither closed nor unbounded.
If  is an uncountable initial ordinal, then the set of all limit ordinals  is closed unbounded in   In fact a  club set is nothing else but the range of a normal function  (i.e. increasing and continuous).

The closed unbounded filter

To see this, one can note that an intersection of closed sets is always closed, so we just need to show that this intersection is unbounded. So fix any  and for each n < ω choose from each  an element  which is possible because each is unbounded. QED.

From this, it can be seen that if  is a regular cardinal, then  is a non-principal -complete proper filter on the set  (that is, on the poset ).

If  is a regular cardinal then club sets are also closed under diagonal intersection.

See also

References

 Jech, Thomas, 2003. Set Theory: The Third Millennium Edition, Revised and Expanded.  Springer.  .
 Lévy, Azriel (1979) Basic Set Theory, Perspectives in Mathematical Logic, Springer-Verlag. Reprinted 2002, Dover. 
 

Ordinal numbers
Set theory